Ceremony is the third extended play from South Korean boy band Pentagon. It was released on June 12, 2017, by Cube Entertainment. The album consists of seven tracks, including the title track, "Critical Beauty".

Commercial performance
The EP sold 23,111+ copies in South Korea. It peaked at number 6 on the Korean Gaon Chart.

Track listing

Charts

References

2017 EPs
Cube Entertainment EPs
Pentagon (South Korean band) EPs
Kakao M EPs
Albums produced by Hui (singer)
Korean-language EPs